Kevin Kimberlin is chairman of Spencer Trask & Co., a technology firm.  Kimberlin's career includes work with Jonas Salk, Walter Gilbert, John Wennberg and Robert Langer.

Technology 
In 1982, Kimberlin invested in Millicom, a startup selected by the Federal Communications Commission to demonstrate the feasibility of cellular telephony. As advisor to the CEO, he structured the first equity financing for Millicom, which started the Racal–Millicom joint venture —subsequently renamed Vodafone Group plc. 

Kimberlin co-founded Ciena Corporation with Optelecom and David R. Huber to commercialize the first dense wave division multiplexing (DWDM) system, powered by Ciena’s patented dual-stage optical amplifier.  As the common basis of all high-capacity fiber communications networks around the world, WDM contributed to growth of the Internet and serves as its foundation today.

Prior to its public offering, Kimberlin was the sole general partner of Next Level Communications, a broadband access company, 20% owned by Kimberlin LLC and 80% owned by General Instrument Corporation. Kimberlin took Next Level through its IPO, achieving a market capitalization of $17 billion before it was acquired by Motorola in 2002.

Medicine 
In 1986, Kimberlin co-founded the Immune Response Corporation with Jonas Salk. The Immune Response Corporation patented the basis of the first FDA approved cancer vaccine, and has contributed to developments in the field of immunotherapy.

He then co-founded Myriad Genetics, the first human genome company, with Nobel Prize winner Dr. Walter Gilbert, Peter Meldrum, and Dr. Mark Skolnick, the scientist who, with several colleagues, devised the gene-mapping technique that catalyzed the Human Genome Project. Myriad Genetics received international acclaim by discovering the breast cancer gene, BRCA1.

Osiris Therapeutics, also co-founded by Kevin Kimberlin, patented and developed the mesenchymal stem cell (MSC). As of June 2020, a search of MSC in ClinicalTrials.gov turned up 1,116 clinical trials registered to treat 928 different medical conditions. Using the MSC as a drug, Osiris received the world's first regulatory approval for a stem cell-based therapy.

Kimberlin helped launch Health Dialog based on the research of John Wennberg whose clinical studies precipitated the Affordable Care Act. Health Dialog provided $130 million in support of Wennberg’s efforts to put patients in charge of their medical decisions. Health Dialog was recognized as one of the fastest-growing private companies in America.

Kimberlin supported Robert Langer in two of the three ventures he discusses in his biography. He was a founding shareholder in Langer's first company, Enzytech which later merged to form Alkermes, and the third largest shareholder in his InVivo Therapeutics.

Philanthropy 
Kimberlin's philanthropic activities in environmental science, education, and creativity include the Audubon Society, Harvard University and Yaddo, which Kimberlin serves as a lifetime honorary director for.

Personal life
In 2014, Kimberlin was reported as one of a number of "prominent investors [who] have taken to Transcendental Meditation".  He received his Bachelor of Sciences degree from Indiana University and his master's degree from Harvard University.

References

External links 
 Spencer Trask & Co.

American chief executives of financial services companies
American philanthropists
Harvard Business School alumni
Living people
American venture capitalists
Year of birth missing (living people)